Club Deportivo Ourense, S.A.D. was a Spanish football team based in Ourense, in the autonomous community of Galicia. Founded in 1952 after the dissolution of old UD Orensana, it played in Segunda División B – Group 1, holding home games at Estadio O Couto, which has a capacity of 5,625 spectators.

In 1967-68, the team completed an entire regular league season without drawing or losing a single game. Ourense won 30 out of 30 league games, but lost out to Elche CF Ilicitano in the promotion play-offs.

The club was dissolved on 15 July 2014.

Season to season

13 seasons in Segunda División
24 seasons in Segunda División B
24 seasons in Tercera División

Last squad

Honours
Tercera División: 1955–56, 1956–57, 1958–59, 1966–67, 1967–68, 1968–69, 1972–73, 2011–12
Copa Federación: 2007–08, 2013–14

Famous players
Note: this list includes players that have appeared in at least 100 league games and/or have reached international status.

References

External links
Official website 
Futbolme team profile 
Unofficial website 

 
1952 establishments in Galicia (Spain)
2014 disestablishments in Galicia (Spain)
Association football clubs established in 1952
Association football clubs disestablished in 2014
Defunct football clubs in Galicia
Football clubs in Galicia (Spain)
Sport in Ourense
Segunda División clubs